Dorota Jolanta Tobiszowska (born 14 December 1966) is a Polish politician. She was elected to the Senate of Poland (10th term) representing the constituency of Katowice.

References 

Living people
1966 births
Place of birth missing (living people)
20th-century Polish politicians
21st-century Polish politicians
20th-century Polish women politicians
21st-century Polish women politicians
Members of the Senate of Poland 2019–2023
Women members of the Senate of Poland